Thomas Haaland may refer to:

Thomas Vigner Christiansen Haaland, Norwegian politician
Thomas Wegner Larsen Haaland, Norwegian politician, banker, and farmer